Vanuatu competed at the 2018 Summer Youth Olympics, in Buenos Aires, Argentina from 6 October to 18 October 2018.

Competitors
The following is the list of number of competitors participating at the Games per sport/discipline.

Athletics

 Boys' 3000 metres - 1 quota Dick Kapalu

Beach volleyball

Vanuatu was given a quota by the tripartite commission for the girls event to qualify a team of 2 athletes for the games.

Field hockey 

Vanuatu qualified a boys and girls team of 9 athletes each at the Oceania Championships 2018.

Boys' tournament 

Preliminary round
Pool A

Final round

Girls' tournament

Preliminary round

Final round

See also
 Vanuatu at the 2018 Commonwealth Games

References

2018 in Vanuatuan sport
Nations at the 2018 Summer Youth Olympics
Vanuatu at the Youth Olympics